The Gentleman Without a Residence may refer to:

 The Gentleman Without a Residence (1915 film), an Austrian silent film
 The Gentleman Without a Residence (1925 film), a German silent comedy film
 The Gentleman Without a Residence (1934 film), an Austrian comedy film